In molecular biology, Enhancer of rudimentary homolog is a protein that in humans is encoded by the ERH gene.

The Drosophila protein enhancer of rudimentary protein is a small protein of 104 amino acids. It has been found to be an enhancer of the rudimentary gene, involved in pyrimidine biosynthesis.

From an evolutionary point of view, enhancer of rudimentary is highly conserved and has been found to exist in probably all multicellular eukaryotic organisms. It has been proposed that this protein plays a role in the cell cycle.

References

Further reading

External links 
 PDBe-KB provides an overview of all the structure information available in the PDB for Human Enhancer of rudimentary homolog (ERH)
 PDBe-KB provides an overview of all the structure information available in the PDB for Mouse Enhancer of rudimentary homolog (ERH)

Protein families